The 2011 Oklahoma State Cowboys football team represented Oklahoma State University in the 2011 NCAA Division I FBS football season. The Cowboys were led by seventh year head coach Mike Gundy and played their home games at Boone Pickens Stadium. They are a member of the Big 12 Conference.

The 2011 season was arguably the best in the Cowboys' 112-year football history. They opened the season with 10 straight wins, in the process rising to #2 in the AP Poll—the school's highest-ever ranking in a major poll. After unexpectedly losing to Iowa State in Ames, they ultimately finished the regular season 11–1, including a 44–10 win over rival Oklahoma for their first win in the Bedlam Series since 2002. They also won their first-ever Big 12 title and their first outright conference title since winning the 1948 Missouri Valley Conference title. They were invited to the Fiesta Bowl, their first-ever Bowl Championship Series bid and the second major-bowl appearance in school history, where they defeated Stanford 41–38 in overtime. The Colley Matrix, an NCAA-designated major selector, chose OSU as national champions.

Personnel

Coaching staff

Schedule

 Originally scheduled to kick off at 9:00 p.m. on 9/17 but was delayed past midnight due to lightning.

Rankings

Game summaries

Louisiana–Lafayette

Arizona

Tulsa

Texas A&M

    
    
    
    
    
    
    
    
    
    
    
    

Oklahoma State won consecutive games for the first time at Kyle Field as Cowboys' fans chanted "Big 12, Big 12" in the final conference matchup between the two teams. Brandon Weeden threw for a school-record 483 yards.

Kansas

Texas

Missouri

Baylor

Kansas State

Texas Tech

Iowa State

Oklahoma

Fiesta Bowl vs. Stanford

References

Oklahoma State
Oklahoma State Cowboys football seasons
Big 12 Conference football champion seasons
Fiesta Bowl champion seasons
Oklahoma State Cowboys football